Darrel Guilbeau is an American voice actor. He began working on voice acting in anime roles, when his friends asked him to audition for Overman King Gainer and he won the title role, Gainer Sanga. Guilbeau is also known as the voice of Mikado Ryugamine from Durarara!!, the title character of Nura: Rise of the Yokai Clan, Rikuo Nura; Hakuryu Ren from the Magi series, and Amaimon from the Blue Exorcist series. He has reprised his roles as Mikado and Rikuo in Durarara!!×2 and Nura: Rise of the Yokai Clan - Demon Capital, respectively.

Filmography

Anime

Video games

References

External links

Darrel Guilbeau at the English Voice Actor & Production Staff Database

Living people
American male video game actors
American male voice actors
Place of birth missing (living people)
21st-century American male actors
Year of birth missing (living people)